Sherri Sylvester (born Sherri Kay Sylvester 1959) was a longtime entertainment reporter for CNN, and sometimes filled in as hostess of Showbiz Today. She was educated at Indiana University Bloomington. Sylvester has subsequently worked as a producer for CBS News, and works with Women Media Pros specializing in Media Interview Training and Media Relations.

References

External links
"Sherri Sylvester and Scott Leon: The Grammy Awards", CNN, February 21, 2001
"Sherri Sylvester: Strike talks long, time short", CNN, May 1, 2001
"An Interview with Keanu Reeves", CNN-Showbiz Today, July 30, 1996
"Hollywood meets NASA in 'Apollo 13'", CNN, June 30, 1995

1959 births
Living people
American television journalists
American women television journalists
Place of birth missing (living people)
Indiana University Bloomington alumni
CNN people
21st-century American women